Zuzana Zemenová (born 5 September 1984) is a former professional tennis player from Slovakia.

Born in Gelnica (to parents Marian and Anna), Zemenová won six singles titles and seven doubles titles (all of them on clay court) on the ITF Women's Circuit.

In 2004, she continued her career as a collegiate player for Baylor University in the United States.
She decided to follow the college route and was part of the Baylor Bears and Lady Bears tennis team from 2004 to 2008.
She reached the finals of the NCAA Division I Women's Tennis Championship in the 2005 singles category, and won the event, defeating Audra Cohen.

She was named the winner of the Honda Sports Award as the nation's best collegiate female tennis player in 2005.

References

External links
 
 

1984 births
Living people
Slovak female tennis players
People from Gelnica District
Baylor Bears women's tennis players
Slovak expatriate sportspeople in the United States
Sportspeople from the Košice Region